Serach bat Asher was, in the Tanakh, a daughter of Asher, the son of Jacob. She is one of the seventy members of the patriarch's family who emigrated from Canaan to Egypt, and her name occurs in connection with the census taken by Moses in the wilderness. She is mentioned also among the descendants of Asher in I Chronicles vii. 30. The fact of her being the only one of her gender to be mentioned in the genealogical lists indicates her extraordinary longevity. This is an outcome of the blessing for longevity she received from Jacob. She is also the heroine of several legends.

In the Torah
There are two mentions of Serach in the Torah.  The first is in Genesis, 46:17, in a passage that begins “These are the names of the Israelites, Jacob and his descendants, who came to Egypt,” and continues to mention all of Jacob's sons, his daughter Dinah, his grandsons, and one granddaughter—Serach.  The passage reads “The sons of Asher: Imnah, Ishvah, Ishvi, Beri’ah, with Serach their sister.”  This sentence is repeated later in the Hebrew Bible in Chronicles, 1 Chronicles 7:30.  One would suppose that, since the Torah mentions 53 grandsons and only one granddaughter, she was a person of significance.

The second time Serach is mentioned is in the Book of Numbers, 26:46.

In Sefer HaYashar
According to The Book of Jasher, Asher married Adon bat Aflal ben Hadad ben Ishmael.  She died before bearing children.  

Asher then married Hadurah bat Abimael ben Heber ben Shem, the widow of Malkiel ben Elam ben Shem. Hadurah bore one daughter to Malkiel, whom he named Serach. After Malkiel died, mother and daughter returned to the house of Abimael. Upon Asher's marriage to Hadurah, he adopted Serach and brought them to Canaan to live in the house of Jacob. This is one of the sources that the Talmud (Megilla) uses to show that an adopted child is considered the child of the adopted parent, as opposed to the genetic parent, in Torah Law. This text praises Serach for her musical skill, beauty and intellect and notes she was raised as an Israelite.

In tradition
A number of midrashim have been written about Serach. According to one midrash, Serach was not Asher's daughter, but his stepdaughter. She was three years old when Asher married her mother, and she was brought up in the house of Jacob, whose affection she won by her remarkable piety and virtue. The best known of the midrashim about her tells of how she was the first to inform Jacob that his son Joseph was still alive. Fearing that the news would be too much of a shock for the old man, however, she informs Jacob while he is praying, by playing a harp and singing in rhyme that Joseph is “alive and living in Egypt, and has two sons, Menassah and Ephraim.” (Egypt in Hebrew is Mizraim, which rhymes with Ephraim.) In return, Jacob blesses her, saying “May you live forever and never die.” According to this midrash, Serach was eventually permitted to enter heaven alive, something achieved only by a scant few others. When Moses appeared to the Elders of Israel, they went to Serach to confirm that he was truly the redeemer. She recognized him by the code phrase "God has surely remembered" (Exodus 3:16 and 4:31) that had been passed down, according to the Midrash, from Abraham to Isaac to Jacob and to his sons. At that stage of the slavery in Egypt there was no-one else who know the authenticity of these code words as authentically as her. These are the same words that Joseph speaks on his deathbed (Genesis 50:24).

Joseph makes his brothers swear that they will bring his bones from Egypt to be buried in the land of Canaan (Genesis 50:25). The Midrash relates that Moses addressed himself to Serach when he wished to learn where the remains of Joseph were to be buried. Without Joseph's bones, the Israelites could not leave Egypt, so the Pharaoh had Egyptians put him in a lead coffin and had it cast into an underground flooded chamber the Nile. This was an attempt to prevent the Israelites ever leaving Egypt. Only Serach was still alive to remember exactly where to find Joseph's bones as she had seen the Egyptians place the coffin in the Nile at the time and the rest of the generation had since died out. According to the Midrash, Serach was "the wise woman" who caused the death of Sheba ben Bichri.

Another story in the Midrash relates that Rabbi Yochanan was discussing the parting of the Red Sea and wondered what the walls of water looked like. There was a discussion in the House of Study as to whether the sea took on the shape of latticework or brickwork. At that moment, Serach bat Asher peered into the window of the study hall and attested, "I was there. They were like lighted [brick] windows." According to another legend, Serach lived until the tribe of Asher was exiled by Shalmaneser V, went with them into exile, and died there, nearly 1,000 years old. According to the legend, her grave is located in Pir Bakran, a small town about 30 km southeast of Isfahan. The site consists of a small synagogue and a huge cemetery which is probably 2,000 years old.

Some consider her the guardian of Israel's communal memory.

Cultural associations
 Edward Einhorn's absurdist comedy The Living Methuselah, appearing in his book of plays entitled The Golem, Methuselah, and Shylock, gives another perspective on both Serach and Methuselah.  In it, Methuselah and Serach have lived to modern day, through all the major disasters of human history.

References

Resources
Bacher, Wilhelm and Isaac Broydé. "Serah". Jewish Encyclopedia. Funk and Wagnalls, 1901–1906.
Sermon on Serach

Book of Genesis people
Women in the Hebrew Bible
Entering heaven alive
Longevity myths